JS41 may refer to:

BAe Jetstream 41, a regional airliner designed by British Aerospace
Ligier JS41, a Formula One car